The 19329/19330 Veer Bhumi Chittaurgarh Express is a daily train service which runs between Indore Junction railway station of Indore, the largest city and commercial hub of Central Indian state, Madhya Pradesh and Ahmedabad, India via Chittorgarh and Udaipur, major cites in Rajasthan.

Coach composition

The train consists of 18 LHB coaches :

 1 AC First Class
 1 AC II Tier
 1 AC III Tier
 9 Sleeper Class
 4 General Unreserved
 2 EoG cum Seating Luggage Rake

History
The train is named after the erstwhile royal city of Chittorgarh. The train used to run between Indore and Udaipur via Ujjain, Ratlam, Mandsaur and Chittorgarh. It has been extended upto Asarva, near Ahmedabad from March 2023.

Service

The 19329/Veer Bhumi Chittaurgarh Express has an average speed of 42 km/hr and covers 479 km in 11 hrs 25 mins.

The 19330/Veer Bhumi Chittaurgarh Express has an average speed of 39 km/hr and covers 479 km in 12 hrs 25 mins.

Route & Halts

The important halts of the train are :

Schedule

Rake sharing

The train shares its rake with 22943/22944 Daund-Indore SF Express.

Direction reversal

Train reverses its direction at:

Traction
Now since the whole route is electrified, it is hauled by a Vadodara Loco Shed-based WAP-5 / WAP-7  electric locomotive from end to end.

See also 

 Udaipur City railway station
 Indore Junction railway station
 Ratlam–Udaipur City Express

References

External links
19329 Veer Bhumi Chittaurgarh Express at India Rail Info
19330 Veer Bhumi Chittaurgarh Express at India Rail Info

Named passenger trains of India
Rail transport in Madhya Pradesh
Transport in Udaipur
Rail transport in Rajasthan
Transport in Indore
Express trains in India